A Fight for Love was a 1919 American Western film directed by John Ford and featuring Harry Carey. The film is considered to be lost.

Plot
As described in a film magazine, Cheyenne Harry (Carey) has a sheriff and posse on his trail because of his knowledge of a cattle rustling incident and makes a dash for safety across the Canada–US border. When the posse stops at the border, he calmly waves his gun and rolls a cigarette. The sheriff, however, has contacted the Canadian Mounted Police, and they are soon watching Harry. He finds refuge with a band of Indians, but then clashes over an Indian girl (May) with Black Michael (Harris), leader of a gang of whiskey runners. Harry's real love is with Kate (Gerber), daughter of local trader Angus McDougal (Fenton). However, his rival here is also Black Michael. Michael kills an Indian and abducts Kate, but Harry follows and rescues her. Harry beats Michael in a terrific fight, with Michael confessing to his crimes before dying.

Cast

See also
 Harry Carey filmography
 List of lost films

References

External links
 

1919 films
1919 lost films
1919 Western (genre) films
American black-and-white films
Films directed by John Ford
Films shot in California
Lost Western (genre) films
Lost American films
Silent American Western (genre) films
Universal Pictures films
1910s American films